Węgliska may refer to the following places:
Węgliska, Lublin Voivodeship (east Poland)
Węgliska, Pomeranian Voivodeship (north Poland)
Węgliska, Subcarpathian Voivodeship (south-east Poland)